Afroguatteria is a small genus of flowering plants in the family Annonaceae, native to Cabinda and Zaire in west Africa. They are climbers, and are closely related to Toussaintia.

Species
, there are two species in the genus Afroguatteria:

Afroguatteria bequaertii (De Wild.) Boutique
Afroguatteria globosa C.N.Paiva

Taxonomy
The genus name of Afroguatteria is in honour of Giambattista Guatteri (1739–1793), an Italian professor of botany in Parma, and the continent, where the plants were found, 'Afro' - africa. 
The genus was first described and published in Bull. Jard. Bot. État Bruxelles Vol.21 on page 104 in 1951.

The genus is recognized by the United States Department of Agriculture and the Agricultural Research Service, but they do not list any known species.

References

Annonaceae
Annonaceae genera
Plants described in 1951
Flora of Cabinda Province
Flora of the Democratic Republic of the Congo